The Subaru BRAT (acronym for “Bi-drive Recreational All-terrain Transporter”) was a light-duty, four-wheel drive coupé utility, version of the Subaru Leone originally introduced in 1977. The BRAT was developed directly from the company's four-wheel drive station wagon model and was first introduced as a 1978 model – following the concept of coupe utilities such as the Chevrolet El Camino and the Ford Ranchero. The BRAT is also known as a Brumby, MV Pickup or Shifter depending on where it was sold. The vehicle was sold from 1978 until 1994.

First Generation 
 
Developed in Japan in 1977 at the request of the President of Subaru of America, the BRAT was introduced to match the demand for small trucks in North America, in order to compete against other manufacturers, such as Toyota, Nissan, and Mazda. Unlike trucks from other manufacturers, all BRATs had four-wheel drive, as they were developed from the existing Leone station wagon. When the Leone was redesigned in 1979 for the 1980 model year, the BRAT continued with the original Gen I body until 1982.

Jump Seats

Although the BRAT could fairly be called a truck, the plastic seats in the cargo bed allowed Subaru to classify the BRAT as a passenger car. North American and Canadian BRAT models featured carpeting, in addition to welded-in, rear-facing jump seats in the cargo area. The seats were a tariff-avoidance ploy, serving actually to circumvent a tariff known as the Chicken tax, as the plastic seats in the cargo bed allowed Subaru to classify the BRAT as a passenger car, rather than as a light truck. This significantly reduced the costs of importing BRATS to North America, as passenger cars were charged a 2.5% import tariff, while light trucks were charged a substantially higher 25% import tariff. They were discontinued after the 1986 model year.

Technical

All BRAT's had four-wheel drive and the Subaru EA engine. Early models received the 1.6 litre EA-71, whereas 1981 and later models received a 1.8 litre EA-81 engine. The 1983 and 1984 models could be purchased with an optional  turbocharged engine. Manual transmissions were standard on all models, and an automatic transmission was available on turbocharged BRAT's. The 1980 and earlier models had a single-range transfer case, while 1981 and later GL models had a dual-range transfer case (DL's still had single range), and all turbocharged models were equipped with a 3 speed automatic transmission with a single-range, push-button, four-wheel drive.

Second Generation 
The BRAT was restyled in 1981 and the jump seats were discontinued after the 1985 model year. The BRAT was re-introduced with a rise in popularity of small trucks being sold in the United States, primarily from Toyota, Nissan, and Mazda. Production continued into 1994 but ceased to be imported to North America in 1987. It was also known as the Brumby in Australia and New Zealand and the MV Pickup / Shifter in the UK. Imports to Europe, Australia (from 1978), and New Zealand continued until February 1994. The BRAT was not sold in Japan and was manufactured for export markets.

Features
Early 80's saw the introduction of a second Gen Targa-Top version. It also had other features, such as: ; a spring-loaded hidden door, for a side step into the cargo bed; and a spare tire mounted under the hood.

In Australia there were specialty features : Ag-quip / packages with graphics, Roo bar, sump guard & rear step bar. Wagon wheels were also optional.

Manufacture
It was an export-only model, never being officially sold in Japan. Due to this, the BRAT became a popular grey import vehicle in Japan.

There were several locations that manufactured the vehicle :

Subaru never considered marketing the BRAT in their home market, due to a truncating demand of pickup trucks that had been occurring since the late 1970s. The declining demand came as a result of Japanese customers shifting to station wagons at that time.

In 1987, exports to North America ceased, but exports to Europe, Australia, Latin America, and New Zealand continued until 1994.

Notable owners
President Ronald Reagan owned a 1978 BRAT until 1998, which he kept at his ranch near Santa Barbara, California. The vehicle has since been restored and returned to the ranch, which is now owned by the Young America's Foundation.

Motorsport 
There have been several private enterprises that have used the BRAT / Brumby / MV Pickup in Motorsport events :
 2014 - Settlement Creek - Brumby desert racer.
 2018 - Freddie Flintoff chose a 1985 BRAT during an electric vehicle challenge on Top Gear series 27.  Unlike the other vehicles, Flintoff kept the petrol engine in situ, as well as installing a Tesla power-plant.
 2020 - 1988 Drag Brumby - Fastest EJ powered vehicle.

Appearances in Media

Along with its most famous owner, here are some instances of the BRAT used in Film / TV & other media :

 A 1985 BRAT, decorated in the Stars and Stripes, was owned by Joy in the television show My Name Is Earl.
 In Kidd Video, Haim Saban and Andy Heyward's first ever live action/animated cartoon series, Whiz owned a 1984 BRAT, which transformed into The Kiddmobile (a hovercraft and submarine) after the band entered a cartoon realm called “The Flipside.”
 In the movie Napoleon Dynamite, the character Rex drove a 1982 BRAT.
 In the Achewood universe, a 1982 BRAT is given to every soul that enters hell.
 The 1980 model is available in several of the Forza racing games.
 In Alaska: The Last Frontier, Season 6 Episode 13, Eivin Kilcher rebuilds a Subaru BRAT for his brother, August.
 A Subaru Brat was featured on  the episode "Tour De Utah" of "Diesel Brothers.

There are also media appearances of the Brumby in adds / television in Australia / NZ :

 Brumby Seen in River Cottage,

Future Concepts 

There were no third generation BRAT / Brumby / MV pickup as the range was discontinued after 1987.

There was however a concept for a Subaru Suiren and later Subaru released a similar vehicle called the Baja.

References

External links

 President Reagan's BRAT, with many photos
Drag Brumby

Cars introduced in 1978
1970s cars
1980s cars
BRAT
All-wheel-drive vehicles
Front-wheel-drive vehicles
Coupé utilities
Cars powered by boxer engines